The Order of Merit is part of the Jamaican honours system, and it is the fourth-highest honour awarded by the nation of Jamaica. The Order of Merit is conferred upon Jamaicans or distinguished citizens of other countries who have achieved international distinction in the field of science, the arts, literature or any other endeavour. The award can be held by no more than 15 living persons. It is not given to more than two people in any one year.

Members and Honorary Members of the order are entitled to wear the insignia of the order as a decoration and to be styled "The Honourable". In addition, they can append the post-nominal letters OM to their names, or OM (Hon.) in the case of Honorary Members. The order's motto is "He that does the truth comes into the light."

The Order of Merit was originally one that was awarded to foreign heads of state, but this function was taken over by the Order of Excellence in 2003.

Recipients
Source:

Living
Donald Jasper Harris (2021) 
Orlando Patterson (2020)
Anthony Abraham Chen (2008)
Jimmy Cliff
Gerald Lalor
Albert Belville Lockhart, co-inventor of Canasol
Sir Meredith Alister McIntyre
Mervyn Morris
Sir Shridath Ramphal
Edward Robinson (2008)
Manley Elisha West,  co-inventor of Canasol
Sir Willard White (2000)

Deceased

Bunny Wailer
Louise Bennett-Coverley (2001)
Cardinal William Knibb (1845) 
Thomas Lecky
The Most Honourable Edna Manley (1980)
The Most Honourable Michael Manley
Bob Marley
Herb McKenley (2004)
Rex Nettleford
Mary Seacole (1990, posthumously)
Sir Philip Manderson Sherlock (1989)
M. G. Smith (1972)
Carl Stone (1993)
Peter Tosh (2012, posthumously)
Cicely Williams
Fidel Castro
Sir Derek Walcott

References

External links 

 Official website

 
Merit, Order of
Orders of merit